Patrick Gordon (ca. 1644 – 17 August 1736) was Deputy Governor of the Province of Pennsylvania and the Lower Counties on the Delaware from 22 June 1726 to 4 August 1736.  He was deputy to the Proprietors of Pennsylvania, the heirs of William Penn, rather than to a governor.  Since the Proprietors were usually in England, he was essentially the Governor.

Gordon had a military, rather than political background, having been a Major in the regular army.  Gordon resided in what is now Mont Clare.  [Note that another Patrick Gordon resided in Mont Clare (in a cave) from 1757.]  Governor Gordon had at least seven children: Sons: Charles, Army(?), and Archibald; and Daughters: Henrietta, Philadelphia, Elizabeth, and Agatha Harriot.

Peace and prosperity prevailed during Gordon's administration as Deputy Governor. An important lawsuit was settled in 1732 that (temporarily) defined the boundaries between Pennsylvania and the Province of Maryland. Also, Chester County was split during his rule, creating Lancaster County. Construction of the first State House, today's Independence Hall, began in 1732. Prior to 1735 in this incomplete new building, members of the state Assembly had met in private homes or at Quaker Meeting Houses.

References

External links 
  Patrick Gordon's second Royal Commission as Deputy Governor

Colonial governors of Pennsylvania
Year of birth uncertain
1736 deaths